This was the first edition of the tournament.

Beatriz Haddad Maia won the tournament, defeating İpek Öz in the final, 5–7, 6–1, 6–4.

Seeds

Draw

Finals

Top half

Bottom half

References

Main Draw

TCCB Open - Singles